Stemshaug Church is a parish church of the Church of Norway in Aure Municipality in Møre og Romsdal county, Norway. It is located in the village of Stemshaug. It is the church for the Stemshaug parish which is part of the Ytre Nordmøre prosti (deanery) in the Diocese of Møre. The red, wooden church was built in a long church design in 1908 by the architect Hans Jakob Sparre. The architect used a dragestil design for the church. The church seats about 300 people.

History

On 21 November 1905, a royal resolution authorized the creation of a new parish within the prestegjeld of Aure. The new parish would cover the northeastern part of the municipality of Aure. On 9 December 1907, another royal resolution authorized the construction of a new church at Stemshaug to serve the new parish. It was designed by Hans Jacob Sparre. The church is larger, but almost identical to the Sæle Church in Balestrand which Sparre designed as well. The church has a tower on the west end of the nave and a choir on the east end. There are two sacristies that flank the choir to the north and south. The new church was consecrated on 9 December 1908. The church was renovated in 1958.

See also
List of churches in Møre

References

Aure, Norway
Churches in Møre og Romsdal
Long churches in Norway
Wooden churches in Norway
20th-century Church of Norway church buildings
Churches completed in 1908
1908 establishments in Norway